Vostorgsky is a rural locality (a settlement) in Vokhtozhskoye Rural Settlement, Gryazovetsky District, Vologda Oblast, Russia. The population was 410 as of 2002.

Geography 
Vostorgsky is located 115 km northeast of Gryazovets (the district's administrative centre) by road. Kamenka is the nearest rural locality.

References 

Rural localities in Gryazovetsky District